La Bougie du Sapeur is a French satirical newspaper launched in 1980 that is published only on Leap Day, making it the world's least frequently published newspaper.

History 
La Bougie du Sapeur was created by JacquesDebuisson and ChristianBailly, as a joke between friends. The newspaper's name, literally The Sapper's Candle, refers to Camember, a sapper in a comic book created by Georges Colomb in 1896. In the story, Camember was born on 29 February and joined the army when he had celebrated his birthday only four times.

Content 
It sells for €4.70 from newsstands for one month, but subscriptions are available€100 per centuryand back issues are €15.

Profits from the 2008 and 2012 editions went to charity.

The 2012 edition of the paper featured a story on the end of the Euro that led readers to believe that the paper supported the politics of the far‑right Frontnational, however, the editor‑in‑chief maintains that the paper is apolitical.

The 2016 edition was the first to be sold in Belgium, Switzerland, Luxembourg, and Canada.

Management 
, Jean d'Indy serves as editor-in-chief and has worked for the paper since 1992.

References 

Newspapers published in Paris
Publications established in 1980
1980 establishments in France
February